Operl Island is a barrier island of Izembek Lagoon in the Bering Sea, and is part of Izembek National Wildlife Refuge

Barrier islands of the United States
Islands of Alaska
Islands of Aleutians East Borough, Alaska